Eijaz Khan (born 28 August 1975) is an Indian film and television actor. He rose to fame by playing the lead roles in Balaji Telefilms serials Kkavyanjali, and Kyaa Hoga Nimmo Kaa. He appeared in the leading role of Raidhan Raj Katara (Mukhi) in the Sony TV program Yeh Moh Moh Ke Dhaagey. In 2019 he was seen in the web series called Halala that premiered on Ullu App and Mayanagari-City of Dreams that premiered on Hotstar. He also appeared in Bigg Boss 14. He left the show due to his prior commitment.

Early life
Khan was born on 28 August 1975 in Hyderabad, India. He has two siblings, a younger brother and sister. By the time he was three-years old, his parent had separated. He and his brother lived with their father in Mumbai while, his mother and sister lived in Hyderabad. His mother died in 1991, and it was after this that he finally met his sister who was 13-years old at the time. He attended Our Lady of Perpetual Succour High School in Chembur, Mumbai, and Datta Meghe College of Engineering where he obtained his civil engineering degree.

Personal life
Eijaz Khan dated television actress Anita Hassanandani for 2½ years.
Eijaz Khan currently is in a relationship with actress Pavitra Punia whom he met in Bigg Boss 14.

Filmography

Feature films

Television series

Web series

Music videos

Awards

Indian Telly Awards
2005 - Best Onscreen Couple with Anita Hassanandani

References

External links

 
 
 

Indian male television actors
Indian male film actors
Male actors from Hyderabad, India
Living people
Male actors in Hindi cinema
Male actors in Hindi television
20th-century Indian male actors
21st-century Indian male actors
1975 births
Actors from Mumbai
Bigg Boss (Hindi TV series) contestants